Vladimir Vladimirovich Marushevsky (12 July 187424 November 1951) was an Imperial Russian general, and served as the last chief of staff of the Russian Republic.

Biography

Early life
Marushevsky was born on July 12, 1874 in Saint Petersburg, into a noble family originated from the Saint Petersburg Government. In 1893 and 1896, he graduated from the Sixth Cadet Corps and the Nikolaev Engineering School respectively. After graduating, he served in several minor battalions. During this time, he was promoted to lieutenant in 1898, and staff captain in 1902.

World War I 
In the first world war he commanded the 3rd Special Infantry Brigade of the Russian Expeditionary Force in France between July 1916 and May 1917.
Between 26 September and 23 November 1917, he was the last Chief of the General Staff of the Russian Empire.
He was briefly arrested in November 1917, by order of the Council of People's Commissars on charges of negotiations against the Soviet government (the same charge was brought against Nikolay Dukhonin, who was killed by soldiers at Stavka), and the sabotage of the armistice with Germany. Together with Marushevsky, General Alexey Manikovsky, who carried out the technical management of the military department, was arrested and sent to Kresty Prison. On December 1, 1917 he was released on parole, after which he fled to Finland and Sweden.

Russian Civil War 
On November 19, 1918 at the invitation of the British and French military missions he came to Arkhangelsk, where he was appointed commander of the Northern Region. At the same time he was a member of the Provisional Government of the Northern Region as Governor-General and the head of the departments of internal affairs, communications, posts and telegraphs. He led the formation of the “White” Northern Army of about 20,000 soldiers. It relied in its activities heavily on the British military contingent, which took part in the Allied military intervention in the north of Russia and led military operations against units of the Red Army. On January 13, 1919, he transferred the duties of the Governor-General to General Yevgeny Miller, remaining commander of the Army (but actually served as Miller's assistant).

From May 1919 he was Lieutenant General. In the summer of 1919, he negotiated with Mannerheim about military cooperation between Finland and the Russian Northern Region. On August 19, 1919, he resigned from the post of commander of the Northern Army and on September 5, 1919, he went to Sweden. 

He went into exile in Yugoslavia, and died in Zagreb in 1951.

References 

1874 births
1951 deaths
People from Petergof
People from Petergofsky Uyezd
Russian nobility
Imperial Russian major generals
White movement generals
Russian military personnel of World War I
White Russian emigrants to Yugoslavia
Recipients of the Order of St. George of the Fourth Degree
Recipients of the Gold Sword for Bravery
Recipients of the Order of St. Vladimir, 4th class
Recipients of the Order of St. Anna, 1st class
Recipients of the Order of St. Anna, 2nd class
Recipients of the Order of St. Anna, 3rd class
Recipients of the Order of St. Anna, 4th class
Recipients of the Order of Saint Stanislaus (Russian), 1st class
Recipients of the Order of Saint Stanislaus (Russian), 2nd class
Recipients of the Order of Saint Stanislaus (Russian), 3rd class